Hasseler Tunnel was a 507-metre tunnel in Saarland, Germany.

See also
Palatine Ludwig Railway

Buildings and structures in Saarpfalz-Kreis
Road tunnels in Germany
Sankt Ingbert